Kečovo is a village and municipality in the Rožňava District in the Košice Region of middle-eastern Slovakia.

History
In historical records the village was first mentioned in 1272.

Geography
The village lies at an altitude of 354 metres and covers an area of 13.574 km².
It has a population of about 395 people.

Culture
The village has a public library and a football pitch.

Genealogical resources

The records for genealogical research are available at the state archive "Statny Archiv in Banska Bystrica, Kosice, Slovakia"

 Roman Catholic church records (births/marriages/deaths): 1852-1896 (parish B)
 Reformated church records (births/marriages/deaths): 1888-1895 (parish B)

See also
 List of municipalities and towns in Slovakia

External links
 Kečovo
https://web.archive.org/web/20080111223415/http://www.statistics.sk/mosmis/eng/run.html
Surnames of living people in Kecovo

Villages and municipalities in Rožňava District